Fritz Paul Lüddecke (23 February 1920 – 10 August 1944) was a Luftwaffe fighter ace from Brakel, Germany. He was the recipient of the Knight's Cross of the Iron Cross during World War II. Fritz Lüddecke was credited with 50 kills all in the Eastern Front (World War II). In 1944 he was killed in action over Wilkowischken, Lithuania.

Career
Lüddecke began his military career on 19 November 1941. He was transferred to 6. Staffel of Jagdgeschwader 51 (JG 51—51st Fighter Wing) on the Eastern Front on 24 August 1942.

With the Stabsstaffel
In early October 1942, II. Gruppe of JG 51 was withdrawn from the Eastern Front and sent to Jesau, near present-day Bagrationovsk, to Heiligenbeil, present-day Mamonovo, to be reequipped with the Focke Wulf Fw 190 A. While undergoing training on this aircraft, the Gruppe received orders on 4 November to transfer to the Mediterranean theatre flying the Bf 109 again. 6. Staffel was exempt from this order, was detached from II. Gruppe, and continued its training on the Fw 190. In late November, 6. Staffel was renamed to Stabsstaffel (headquarters squadron) of JG 51 and placed under the command of Diethelm von Eichel-Streiber on 30 November.

The Stabsstaffel transferred to the Eastern Front again on 5 February 1943 where it was based at an airfield at Smolensk. There, the fought in support of the 9th Army during the Battles of Rzhev. On 9 March, the Stabsstaffel was scrambled multiple times in defense of the airfield. The Stabsstaffel was tasked with providing fighter protection of the Smolensk airfield on 15 March. In the morning, the Stabsstaffel was scrambled to intercept a flight of Ilyushin Il-2 ground-attack aircraft north of Smolensk and claimed four aerial victories including an Il-2 aircraft by Lüddecke.

On the first day of the Battle of Kursk, 5 July 1943, the Stabsstaffel relocated from Smolensk to Oryol where it fought over the northern face of the salient. On 13 July, the Stabsstaffel was deployed over the combat area near Novosil where they engaged in combat with Soviet fighters. During this engagement, the Staffel claimed five aerial victories, including a Lavochkin La-5 fighter by Lüddecke, for the loss of one of their own.

Following hits by anti-aircraft artillery, he attempted an emergency landing when his aircraft exploded in mid-air. He was posthumously awarded the German Cross in Gold on 1 October 1944, and the Knight's Cross of the Iron Cross on 18 November 1944.

Summary of career

Aerial victory claims
According to Jacobs and Obermaier, Lüddecke was credited with 50 aerial victories all of which claimed on the Eastern Front. He flew more than 600 combat missions, including 150 fighter-bomber missions. Matthews and Foreman, authors of Luftwaffe Aces — Biographies and Victory Claims, researched the German Federal Archives and found records for 51 aerial victory claims, all of which claimed on the Eastern Front.

Victory claims were logged to a map-reference (PQ = Planquadrat), for example "PQ 54284". These sectors were then subdivided into 36 smaller units to give a location area 3 × 4 km in size.

Awards
 Iron Cross (1939) 2nd and 1st Class
 Honour Goblet of the Luftwaffe on 13 December 1943 as Feldwebel and pilot
 German Cross in Gold on 1 October 1944 as Feldwebel in the Stabsstaffel/Jagdgeschwader 51
 Knight's Cross of the Iron Cross on 18 November 1944 as Oberfeldwebel and pilot in the Stabsstaffel/Jagdgeschwader 51 "Mölders"

See also
 List of Knight's Cross of the Iron Cross recipients (L)
 List of World War II aces from Germany
 List of World War II flying aces

Notes

References

Citations

Bibliography

External links
 Traces of war
 World War Photos photo of Lüddecke with a Messerschmitt
TracesOfWar.com
Aces of the Luftwaffe

1920 births
1944 deaths
Luftwaffe pilots
German World War II flying aces
Recipients of the Gold German Cross
Recipients of the Knight's Cross of the Iron Cross
Luftwaffe personnel killed in World War II
Aviators killed by being shot down
People from Reutlingen
People from the Free People's State of Württemberg
Military personnel from Baden-Württemberg